WCAR may refer to:

 World Conference against Racism - International events organized by the UN to combat racism 
 World Conference against Racism 2001 - The 2001 WCAR in Durban South Africa
 Durban Review Conference - The 2009 Durban Review Conference (WCAR 2009)
 We Came as Romans, an American metalcore band from  Troy, Michigan 
 WCAR, an American AM radio station licensed to Livonia, Michigan
 WDFN, an American AM radio station in the Detroit, Michigan, market that used the WCAR call letters (1939-1979)